The Wolseley Aquarius I or A.R.7 was a British seven-cylinder, air-cooled radial aero engine that first ran in 1933, it was designed and built by Wolseley Motors. Intended for the military trainer aircraft market few were produced, as Wolseley withdrew from the aero engine market in 1936.

Applications
Hawker Tomtit

Specifications (A.R.7)

See also

References

Notes

Bibliography

 Lumsden, Alec. British Piston Engines and their Aircraft. Marlborough, Wiltshire: Airlife Publishing, 2003. .

External links
Flight, January 1936 - Wolseley Aquarius advertisement

1930s aircraft piston engines
Aircraft air-cooled radial piston engines
Aquarius